Chatswood is a suburb in the city of Auckland, New Zealand, in the middle-eastern side of North Shore. It contains a primary school and many parks. To the south of Chatswood is Kendall's Bay, a small bay of the Waitematā Harbour. The suburb is under the governance of Auckland Council. The Royal New Zealand Navy's Kauri Point Armament Depot is located in Chatswood. Chelsea Sugar Refinery is located in Chatswood.

History
Prior to European contact, the area was heavily forested with kauri and other conifer trees. Many Te Kawerau ā Maki Māori lived in the area until the 1840s at Rongohau (Kendall Bay), and at Kauri Point Centennial Park which was the site of Te Matarae ō Mana, a fortified pā named after iwi ancestor Manaoterangi. In the early 1700s, Mana married Waikahina, sister to Kiwi Tāmaki, the paramount chief of the Waiohua confederacy. After the confederacy were defeated around 1740 by Ngāti Whātua, Mana and his people were able to keep living at Mangonui, due to the close familial relationship between Mana and Ngāti Whātua chief Tūperiri. Mana died in the 1790s. Based on archaeological studies of the pā, little activity such as food storage or refilled pits occurred in the pā compared to contemporary sites. Other pā associated with the ares include Onewa Pā, likely on the western side of Kendall Bay, which was occupied by Ngāti Whātua leader Tarahawaiki (the father of Āpihai Te Kawau), and Maunganui, likely inland behind Kauri Point. Kendall Bay and Kauri Point were prime locations for controlling access to the upper Waitematā Harbour, and was close to a shark fishery.

Chatswood was built on 100 hectares of land owned by Chelsea Sugar and sold for subdivision in the 1960s.

In 1986, the Kauri Point Centennial Park was created to mark 100 years since the creation of the Birkenhead Borough Council.

Demographics

Chatswood had a population of 3,531 at the 2018 New Zealand census, an increase of 129 people (3.8%) since the 2013 census, and an increase of 105 people (3.1%) since the 2006 census. There were 1,134 households, comprising 1,740 males and 1,791 females, giving a sex ratio of 0.97 males per female. The median age was 38.9 years (compared with 37.4 years nationally), with 627 people (17.8%) aged under 15 years, 705 (20.0%) aged 15 to 29, 1,647 (46.6%) aged 30 to 64, and 552 (15.6%) aged 65 or older.

Ethnicities were 59.7% European/Pākehā, 4.7% Māori, 1.8% Pacific peoples, 36.9% Asian, and 3.9% other ethnicities. People may identify with more than one ethnicity.

The percentage of people born overseas was 48.2, compared with 27.1% nationally.

Although some people chose not to answer the census's question about religious affiliation, 54.5% had no religion, 32.1% were Christian, 2.5% were Hindu, 0.9% were Muslim, 1.7% were Buddhist and 1.8% had other religions.

Of those at least 15 years old, 1,191 (41.0%) people had a bachelor's or higher degree, and 240 (8.3%) people had no formal qualifications. The median income was $36,700, compared with $31,800 nationally. 744 people (25.6%) earned over $70,000 compared to 17.2% nationally. The employment status of those at least 15 was that 1,416 (48.8%) people were employed full-time, 420 (14.5%) were part-time, and 90 (3.1%) were unemployed.

Education

Notes

External links
 Chelsea School website'
Chelsea Sugar website

Suburbs of Auckland
North Shore, New Zealand
Populated places around the Waitematā Harbour
Kaipātiki Local Board Area